Daniel Messersi (born 29 December 1992) is an Italian badminton player.

Achievements

BWF International Challenge/Series 
Men's doubles

  BWF International Challenge tournament
  BWF International Series tournament
  BWF Future Series tournament

References

External links 
 

1992 births
Living people
Italian male badminton players